The Karate Kid Part III is a 1989 American martial arts drama film, the third entry in the Karate Kid franchise and a sequel to The Karate Kid Part II (1986). It stars Ralph Macchio, Pat Morita, Robyn Lively, and Thomas Ian Griffith in his film debut. As was the case with the first two films in the series, it was directed by John G. Avildsen and written by Robert Mark Kamen, with stunts choreographed by Pat E. Johnson and music composed by Bill Conti. In the film, the returning John Kreese, with the help of his best friend Terry Silver, attempts to gain revenge on Daniel and Mr. Miyagi which involves hiring a ruthless martial artist and harming their relationship.

Though moderately successful at the box office, The Karate Kid Part III received generally negative reviews, with criticism aimed at its rehashing of elements found in its two predecessors, though Griffith's performance as Silver received praise from some critics. It was followed by The Next Karate Kid in 1994.

Plot
In September 1985, John Kreese, broke and destitute after the loss of his students due to the events in The Karate Kid, visits his Vietnam War comrade, a shady businessman named Terry Silver. Silver vows to personally help him get revenge on Daniel LaRusso and Mr. Miyagi and re-establish Cobra Kai. Silver sends Kreese to Tahiti to relax and hires Mike Barnes, a vicious national karate champion, to challenge Daniel at the upcoming All-Valley Karate Tournament. Upon returning to Los Angeles from Okinawa, Daniel and Miyagi discover that the South Seas apartment complex is being renovated, leaving Miyagi unemployed and Daniel homeless. Miyagi allows Daniel to live in his home, as his mother Lucille is in New Jersey to care for his ill uncle. Daniel uses his college funds to help finance Miyagi's dream of opening a bonsai shop, and Miyagi makes him a partner in the business. Meanwhile, Silver approaches Daniel and Miyagi as a friend, claiming that Kreese is dead and that he is apologizing on his behalf.

Visiting the pottery store across the street, Daniel meets one of the employees, Jessica Andrews. He later finds out that she is from Columbus, Ohio and has not made any friends yet during the two months she has worked there. After seeing a picture of her rock climbing with a man whose face had been torn out of the photo, they plan to go out on a date that evening. However, when Daniel comes to pick Jessica up, they decide just to be friends as he learns that Jessica has made up with her boyfriend.

Later, Barnes and his friends, Snake and Dennis, harass Daniel and Jessica and even steal the bonsai trees from Miyagi's shop. Daniel and Jessica decide to dig up and sell a valuable bonsai tree that Miyagi brought from Okinawa to replace the missing trees. As they retrieve it, Barnes and his friends appear and retract their climbing ropes, demanding that Daniel sign up for the tournament. He asks Miyagi to train him for the upcoming tournament, but Miyagi refuses due to his principles.

Silver offers to train Daniel for the tournament at the Cobra Kai dojo with a series of brutal, violent techniques. This alienates Daniel from Miyagi and leads him to violently attack a stranger that was bribed by Silver to provoke him. Daniel apologizes and makes amends with Jessica as she prepares to go home. She forgives him and encourages him to make amends with Miyagi. He also promises to send her a Christmas card as he leaves. 

Later, after successfully apologizing to Miyagi, Daniel visits Silver at the Cobra Kai dojo to tell him he will not compete in the tournament. Silver discloses his true agenda to Daniel as Barnes and Kreese appear. Barnes begins to beat Daniel, but Miyagi intervenes and defeats Kreese, Silver, and Barnes. After the scuffle, he finally agrees to train Daniel. At the tournament, Silver reveals his plan to use Cobra Kai's victory to re-establish Cobra Kai and turn it into a business franchise. Barnes reaches the final round to challenge Daniel. Silver and Kreese instruct Barnes to make Daniel suffer by successfully gaining and losing points using illegal tactics. The match ends in a sudden death overtime. Daniel wants to quit, but Miyagi urges him to continue, saying Daniel must not lose to his fear and that his best karate is still inside him. With this encouragement, Daniel performs the kata and strikes Barnes to win the tournament, while Kreese and Silver become dispirited with their plans to revive Cobra Kai now over.

Cast

 Ralph Macchio as Daniel LaRusso
 Noriyuki "Pat" Morita as Mr. Miyagi
 Thomas Ian Griffith as Terry Silver
 Robyn Lively as Jessica Andrews
 Sean Kanan as Mike Barnes
 William Christopher Ford as Dennis
 Jonathan Avildsen as Snake
 Martin Kove as John Kreese
 Randee Heller as Lucille LaRusso
 Pat E. Johnson as Referee
 Rick Hurst as Announcer
 Frances Bay as Mrs. Milo
 Joseph V. Perry as Uncle Louie
 Jan Tříska as Milos
 Glenn Medeiros as himself
 Gabriel Jarret as Rudy

Production
Robert Mark Kamen had originally wanted The Karate Kid Part III to be a prequel with the two main leads still involved. The original plot would have involved Daniel and Mr. Miyagi traveling to 16th century China in a dream and meeting Miyagi's ancestors. Kamen envisioned the sequel to resemble a Hong Kong-style Wuxia film, and would also have a female protagonist. However, the producers balked at the idea and Kamen was reluctant on rehashing "the same story all over again"; he only returned after the studio agreed to pay him substantially more.

After Robyn Lively was cast as Jessica Andrews in The Karate Kid Part III in 1988, producers were forced to modify her role of protagonist Daniel LaRusso's new love interest because Lively was only 16 at the time of filming and still a minor, while Ralph Macchio was 27 (although his character Daniel is 17). This situation caused romantic scenes between Jessica and Daniel to be rewritten so that the pair only developed a close friendship. Although he plays a Vietnam veteran who is roughly 20 years older than Daniel, Griffith is actually a few months younger than Macchio.

John Kreese was initially intended to have a larger role in the film, but due to Martin Kove's filming schedule conflicts with Hard Time on Planet Earth, the character of Terry Silver was written into the script.

The film featured the same crew from the first two films, except for two key people: executive producer R.J. Louis, who was replaced by Sheldon Schrager, and cinematographer James Crabe, who was forced to pull out due to the AIDS virus making him severely ill at the time, was replaced by Steve Yaconelli. On May 2, 1989, Crabe died from AIDS at the age of 57; the film was dedicated to his memory.

Release
The film was released in the United States on June 30, 1989. In the Philippines, the film was released on September 6.

Critical reception
On Rotten Tomatoes, the film holds an approval rating of 15% based on 33 reviews and an average rating of 3.8/10. The website's critics consensus reads: "Inspiration is in short supply in this third Karate Kid film, which recycles the basic narrative from its predecessors but adds scenery-chewing performances and a surprising amount of violence". On Metacritic, the film has a weighted average score of 36 out of 100, based on 12 critics, indicating "generally unfavorable reviews". Audiences polled by CinemaScore gave the film an average grade of "B−" on an A+ to F scale.

Roger Ebert, who praised the first two films, did not enjoy Part III. His colleague, Gene Siskel, also did not recommend the film, though he commended the performance of Thomas Ian Griffith, which he thought was nearly enough to save it. Critic Kevin Thomas of the Los Angeles Times stated that "writer Robert Mark Kamen gave director Avildsen and his cast too little to work with".

Caryn James of The New York Times was critical of the lack of character development for the film's protagonist, saying that he "has aged about a year in movie time and hasn't become a day smarter" and criticized the film for having "the rote sense of film makers trying to crank out another moneymaker".

A 2008 DVD review of the film from Scott Weinberg of the website JoBlo said it was the installment of the series "where the wheels started to come off", remarking that it "approaches the Karate Kid formula as if it's the world's last home-cooked meatloaf", deriding the "cartoonishness" of the villains, and saying that "it all feels cynical and hollow...which is NOT the vibe we still get from Part 1". Reviewing a 2001 UK DVD of the film, Almar Haflidason of the BBC praised the disc's picture and sound quality, but dismissed the film as a "desperate continuation of The Karate Kid franchise [which] shudders to a pathetic halt" and criticized its loss of "any warmth of the previous two films".

In 2015, director John G. Avildsen called the film "a horrible imitation of the original...hastily written and sloppily rewritten", adding that it "will baffle those who haven't seen the first two (movies) and insult those who have". Ralph Macchio was also disappointed with the film, stating that he "just felt for the LaRusso character he never went forward" and that when doing The Karate Kid Part III it "felt like we were redoing the first movie in a cartoon kind of a sense without the heart and soul".

The Karate Kid Part III was nominated for 5 Razzies at the 1989 Golden Raspberry Awards: Worst Picture (Jerry Weintraub); Worst Screenplay (Robert Mark Kamen); Worst Director (John G. Avildsen); Worst Actor (Macchio) and Worst Supporting Actor (Pat Morita).

References

External links

 Official trailer
 
 
 
 The Karate Kid and Cobra Kai - Reunited Apart, December 21, 2020

1989 films
1980s action drama films
1980s coming-of-age films
1980s teen drama films
1989 drama films
1989 martial arts films
American coming-of-age drama films
American films about revenge
American martial arts films
American sequel films
American teen drama films
Columbia Pictures films
1980s English-language films
Films about bullying
Films directed by John G. Avildsen
Films scored by Bill Conti
Films set in 1985
Films set in the San Fernando Valley
Films shot in Los Angeles
Films with screenplays by Robert Mark Kamen
Karate films
Martial arts tournament films
The Karate Kid (franchise) films
1980s American films